Bellegra is a town and comune in the Metropolitan City of Rome, in the  Lazio region of central Italy.

Its original name since 11 January 967 had been Civitella. The town council changed that name to its current one on 10 October 1880, out of the belief that the town lay on the site of an ancient town called Belecre, possibly from the Latin bella aegra (blood-stained wars).

References

Cities and towns in Lazio